New Castle Area School District is a public school district located in Lawrence County, Pennsylvania. The district serves the city of New Castle and Taylor Township. According to 2017 Census Estimates, the district served 22,069 residents, down from 23,273 residents in the 2010 Census.

New Castle Area School District operates four schools: Croton Pre-Kindergarten, Harry W. Lockley Early Learning Center, George Washington Intermediate School, and New Castle Junior/Senior High School.

Schools

Junior-Senior High School
New Castle Junior Senior High School is located at 300 East Lincoln Avenue. The school first opened in 2004 to Senior High students and opened to Junior High students a year later at a total construction cost of $40,300,000. As of the 2018–2019 school year, 771 students were housed in the Senior High wing, 502 students were housed in the Junior High wing. This is a total of 1,273 students housed in the building, up from 1,262 the previous school year. As of the 2019–2020 school year, grade 6 is also housed in the high school in its own separate wing. The Senior High School principal is Mr. Richard Litrenta, and the assistant principals are Mr. Ralph Blundo and Mrs. Jonalyn Romeo. The Junior High School principal is Mrs. Carol Morell and the assistant principal is Mrs. Jonalyn Romeo.

George Washington Intermediate School 
George Washington Intermediate is located at 101 East Euclid Avenue. It first opened in 1928, and since has had many major renovations to modernize the building. The school houses grades 3 through 5 as of the 2019–2020 school year, as grade 6 was moved to the Junior-Senior High School. In the 2018–2019 school year, 986 students were enrolled at this building. The building's principal is Mr. David Antuono

Harry W. Lockley Early Learning Center 
Harry W. Lockley Early Learning Center is located at 900 East Main Street, New Castle, is the newest building in the New Castle Area School District. Completed in 2013 after an expansion and modernization to a former building, and was constructed at a cost of $19,031,300. The school houses grades Kindergarten through second grade. In the 2018–2019 school year, 802 pupils were enrolled at this school. The building's principal is Mr. Joe Anderson.

Croton Pre-Kindergarten Center 
Croton Pre-Kindergarten Center is located at 420 Fern Street. In the 2018–2019 school year, 80 students were enrolled at the school. The building's principal is Mr. Joe Anderson.

Former Schools 
A list of the former schools of the New Castle Area School District. Two schools, Mahoning and West Pittsburg, were annexed from defunct school districts.

Sports Offered
New Castle Area School District offers an extensive sports program.

The District funds:

Boys
Baseball - AAAA
Basketball- AAAA
Cross country - AAA
Football - AAA
Golf - AAA
Track and field - AAA
Wrestling - AAA

Girls
Basketball - AAA
Cross country - AA
Softball - AAA
Track and field - AAA
Volleyball - AA
Junior High School Sports

Boys
Baseball
Basketball
Cross country
Football
Track and field

Girls
Basketball
Cross country
Softball 
Track and field
Volleyball

The district also participates in Bocce programs through the Special Olympics.

References

School districts in Lawrence County, Pennsylvania
New Castle, Pennsylvania